Tomy's Secret (Spanish: El secreto de Tomy) is a 1963 French-Spanish musical film directed by Antonio del Amo and starring Fabienne Dali, Joselito and Fernando Casanova.

The film's sets were designed by Sigfrido Burmann.

Cast

References

Bibliography 
 de España, Rafael. Directory of Spanish and Portuguese film-makers and films. Greenwood Press, 1994.

External links 
 

1963 musical films
Spanish musical films
1963 films
French musical films
1960s Spanish-language films
Films directed by Antonio del Amo
Films produced by Cesáreo González
1960s Spanish films
1960s French films
Spanish-language French films